Mount Radotina is the rounded ice-covered peak rising to 1754 m in the west foothills of Bruce Plateau on Graham Coast in Graham Land, Antarctica.  It is situated at the base of Barison Peninsula.  The feature has steep, rocky and partly ice-free northeast and southwest slopes, and surmounts Chernomen Glacier to the northwest, Talev Glacier to the north, Cadman Glacier to the east-northeast and Luke Glacier to the southwest.

The mountain is named after the settlement of Radotina in Western Bulgaria.

Location
British mapping in 1976.

Maps
 Antarctic Digital Database (ADD). Scale 1:250000 topographic map of Antarctica. Scientific Committee on Antarctic Research (SCAR). Since 1993, regularly upgraded and updated.
British Antarctic Territory. Scale 1:200000 topographic map. DOS 610 Series, Sheet W 65 62. Directorate of Overseas Surveys, Tolworth, UK, 1976.

Notes

References
 Bulgarian Antarctic Gazetteer. Antarctic Place-names Commission. (details in Bulgarian, basic data in English)
Mount Radotina. SCAR Composite Antarctic Gazetteer.

External links
 Mount Radotina. Copernix satellite image

Mountains of Graham Land
Bulgaria and the Antarctic
Graham Coast